John Corcoran (20 March 1937 – 8 January 2021) was an American logician, philosopher, mathematician, and historian of logic. He is best known for his philosophical work on concepts such as the nature of inference, relations between conditions, argument-deduction-proof distinctions, the relationship between logic and epistemology, and the place of proof theory and model theory in logic. Nine of Corcoran's papers have been translated into Spanish, Portuguese, Persian, and Arabic; his 1989 "signature" essay was translated into three languages. Fourteen of his papers have been reprinted; one was reprinted twice.

His work on Aristotle's logic of the Prior Analytics is regarded as being highly faithful both to the Greek text and to the historical context. It is the basis for many subsequent investigations.

His mathematical results on definitional equivalence of formal character-string theories, sciences of strings of characters over finite alphabets, are foundational for logic, formal linguistics, and computer science.

Education 
Corcoran studied engineering at the Baltimore Polytechnic Institute, with a degree in Advanced Curriculum Engineering in 1956, and at the Johns Hopkins University with a BES in Mechanical Engineering in 1959. After briefly working in engineering, he studied philosophy at the Johns Hopkins University where he obtained his PhD in philosophy in 1963. His post-doctoral studies in mathematics were at Yeshiva University in
1964 and at the University of California Berkeley in 1965. His dissertation topic was Generative Structure of Two-valued Logics.

Corcoran's first logic teacher was Albert Hammond. Corcoran studied Plato and Aristotle with Ludwig Edelstein.  His next two logic teachers were Joseph Ullian and Richard Wiebe. Corcoran's dissertation supervisor was Robert McNaughton.  At Yeshiva University in New York City Corcoran studied with Raymond Smullyan and Martin Davis. Corcoran's first tenure-track position was at the University of Pennsylvania, where his dissertation supervisor was a Professor of Computer and Information Science.

Regular academic or research appointments 
He was Professor of Philosophy, University at Buffalo (SUNY) since 1973; Associate Professor of Philosophy, University at Buffalo between 1970–1973;
Assistant Professor of Linguistics, University of Pennsylvania between 1965–1969; Member of
Linguistics Group, IBM Research Center between 1963–1964.

Visiting academic or research appointments 
He is or was Visiting Professor of Logic, University of
Santiago de Compostela 1994; Visiting Scholar, Linguistic Institute, SUNY Oswego 1976; NSF
Seminar Project Director, Linguistic Institute, University at Buffalo 1971; Visiting Associate
Professor of Philosophy and Research Associate, University of Michigan 1969–1970; Visiting
Lecturer in Philosophy, University of California, Berkeley 1964–1965; Mathematician, General Electric Research Laboratory 1962; Mathematician, Aeronca Astromechanics Institute, 1961; Junior
Instructor in Philosophy, Johns Hopkins University 1960–1961.

Research profile 
Corcoran's work in history of logic involves most of the discipline's
productive periods. He has discussed Aristotle, the Stoics, William of Ockham, Giovanni Girolamo Saccheri, George Boole, Richard Dedekind, Gottlob Frege, Charles Sanders Peirce, Clarence Irving Lewis, the American Postulate Theorists, Alfred Tarski, Willard Van Orman Quine, and Warren Goldfarb.

His 1972 interpretation of Aristotle's Prior Analytics, proposed independently by Timothy Smiley at about the same time, has been found to be more faithful than previous interpretations both to the Greek text and to the historical context. It has formed the basis for subsequent investigations by Edgar Andrade, George Boger, Manuel Correia, Paolo Crivelli, Newton da Costa, Catarina Dutilh, Paolo Fait, Nicolas Fillion, James Gasser, Klaus Glashoff, John Martin, Mary Mulhern, Michael Scanlan, Robin Smith, Neil Tennant, and others. It was adopted for the 1989 translation of the Prior Analytics by Robin Smith and for the 2009 translation of the Prior Analytics Book A by Gisela Striker.

His 1980 critical reconstruction of Boole's original 1847 system revealed previously unnoticed gaps and errors in Boole's work and established the essentially Aristotelian basis of Boole's philosophy of logic. A 2003 article provides a systematic comparison and critical evaluation of Aristotelian logic and Boolean logic; it also reveals the centrality of wholistic reference in Boole's philosophy of logic. According to Corcoran, Boole fully accepted and endorsed Aristotle's logic. Boole did not dispute one point that Aristotle made, but he did  "go under, over, and beyond" Aristotle's logic by 1) providing it with mathematical foundations involving equations,  2) extending the class of problems it could treat—to assessing validity he added solving equations, and 3) expanding the range of applications it could handle—e.g. from propositions having only two terms to those having arbitrarily many.

More specifically, Boole agreed with what Aristotle said; Boole's 'disagreements', if they might be called that, concern what Aristotle did not say.
First, in the realm of foundations, Boole reduced Aristotle's four propositional forms to one form, that of equations—by itself a revolutionary idea.
Second, in the realm of logic's problems, Boole's addition of equation solving to logic—another revolutionary idea—involved Boole's doctrine that Aristotle's rules of inference (the "perfect syllogisms") must be supplemented by rules for equation solving.
Third, in the realm of applications, Boole's system could handle multi-term propositions and arguments whereas Aristotle could handle only two-termed subject-predicate propositions and arguments. For example, Aristotle's system could not deduce "No quadrangle that is a square is a rectangle that is a rhombus" from "No square that is a quadrangle is a rhombus that is a rectangle" or from "No rhombus that is a rectangle is a square that is a quadrangle".

His collaboration with Alfred Tarski in the late 1970s and early 1980s led to publications on Tarski's work and to the 2007 article Notes on the Founding of Logics and Metalogic: Aristotle, Boole, and Tarski, which traces Aristotelian and Boolean ideas in Tarski's work and which confirms Tarski's status as a founding figure in logic on a par with Aristotle and Boole.

Scientific work 
His work in philosophy of logic focuses on the nature of logic, the role of logic in
inquiry, the conceptual structure of logic, the metaphysical and epistemological presuppositions
of logic, the nature of mathematical logic and the gaps between logical theory and mathematical
practice. His mathematical logic treats propositional logics, modal logics, identity logics,
syllogistic logics, the logic of first-order variable-binding term operators, second-order logics,
model theory, and the theory of strings – a discipline which is foundational in all areas of logic
and which provides essential background for all of his other mathematical work. In philosophy of mathematics Corcoran has been guided by a nuanced and inclusionary Platonism which
strives to do justice to all aspects of mathematical and logical experience including those aspects
emphasized by competing philosophical perspectives such as logicism, constructivism,
deductivism, and formalism. Although several of his philosophical papers presuppose little
history or mathematics, his historical papers often involve either original philosophy (e.g. his
recent BSL article "Schemata") or original mathematics (e.g. his 1980 HPL article
"Categoricity"). He has referred to the mathematical dimension of his approach to history as
mathematical archaeology. His philosophical papers often involve original historical research. He has been
guided by the Aristotelian principle that the nature of modern thought is sometimes best
understood in light of its historical development, a view that he attributes to Arthur Lovejoy's
History of Ideas Program at Johns Hopkins University and in which he has been encouraged by
the American philosopher and historian Peter Hare.

Collaboration 
Many of Corcoran's articles and reviews are co-authored and many of his single-author
publications acknowledge involvement of colleagues and students. Corcoran emphasizes the
intensely and essentially personal nature of all genuine knowledge including logical knowledge.
Nevertheless, he also stresses the importance of communities of knowers and how much each person can
benefit in the personal search for truth from critical cooperation with other objective researchers. For over 40 years he was the leader of the "Buffalo Syllogistic Group"—a community of philosophers, historians, linguists, logicians, and mathematicians dedicated to the study of the origin of logic. The achievements of this community are sketched in his 2009 paper "Aristotle's Logic at the University at Buffalo's Department of Philosophy", Ideas y Valores: Revista Colombiana de Filosofía 140 (August 2009) 99–117.
A list of his publications, complete through 2000, appears in the 1999 volume of History and Philosophy of Logic, which also includes the expository article by M. Scanlan and S. Shapiro
"The Work of John Corcoran: An Appreciation". Other articles about his work include
"Corcoran the Mathematician" by S. Shapiro, "Corcoran the Philosopher" by J. M. Sagüillo, and
"Corcoran in Spanish" by C. Martínez-Vidal; all appear in a 2007 volume published by the
University of Santiago de Compostela Press.
Corcoran's work in the 1990s on information-theoretic logic is discussed by José M. Sagüillo in the article "Methodological Practice and Complementary Concepts of Logical Consequence: Tarski's Model-Theoretic Consequence and Corcoran's Information-Theoretic Consequence" (History and Philosophy of Logic
volume 30, 2009, 21-48), which received the 2009 Ivor Grattan-Guinness Award for the History and Philosophy of Logic (informaworld.com).

Publications 
Three Logical Theories. Philosophy of Science 36:1969. 153–177.
Completeness of an Ancient Logic. Journal of Symbolic Logic 37: 1972. 696–702.
Gaps Between Logical Theory and Mathematical practice. In Bunge, M., Ed. Methodological Unity of Science. Dordrecht: Kluwer. 1973. 23–50.
Meanings of Implication, Dialogos 9 (1973) 59–76. Reprinted in R. Hughes, Ed., Philosophical companion to first order logic. Indianapolis: Hackett. 1993. Spanish translation by J. M. Saguillo Agora 5(1985) 279–294.
Aristotle's Natural Deduction System. In Ancient Logic and its Modern Interpretations. Ed. J. Corcoran, Dordrecht: Kluwer, 1974. 85–131.
Remarks on Stoic Deduction. Ibid., 169–181.
String Theory. Journal of Symbolic Logic 39 (1974) 625–37. With W. Frank, and M. Maloney.
Logical Structures of Ockham's Theory of Supposition. Franciscan Studies 38(1978) 161–83. With J. Swiniarski.
Crossley on Mathematical Logic. Philosophia 8(1978) 79–94. Spanish translation by A. Garciadiego Mathesis X (1988) 133–150. With S. Shapiro.
Categoricity. History and Philosophy of Logic 1(1980) 187–208. Reprinted in S. Shapiro, Ed., The Limits of Logic, Aldershot, England: Dartmouth Publishing Company. 1996.
Boole's Criteria of Validity and Invalidity. Notre Dame Journal of Formal Logic 21(1980) 609–639. With S. Wood. Reprinted in J. Gasser, Ed. Boole Anthology. Dordrecht: Kluwer.2000.
Introduction and analytical index. In Tarski, A. Logic, Semantics, Metamathematics. Second ed. Edited by J. Corcoran. Trans. J. H. Woodger. Indianapolis: Hackett. 1983.
Contemporary Relevance of Ancient Logical Theory. Philosophical Quarterly 32(1982) 76–86. With M. Scanlan.
Argumentations and Logic. Argumentation 3(1989) 17–43., Spanish translation by R. Fernandez and J. Sagüillo Agora 13/1 (1994) 27–55.
Review of Alfred Tarski: Collected Papers. 4 Vols. Edited by S. Givant and R. McKenzie. Basel: Birkhäuser. 1986. Mathematical Reviews 91h:01101, 2, 3,4. 1991.
The Founding of Logic. Ancient Philosophy 14(1994) 9–24.
Information-theoretic logic, in Truth in Perspective edited by C. Martínez, U. Rivas, L. Villegas-Forero, Ashgate Publishing Limited, Aldershot, England (1998) 113–135.
Second-Order Logic. In the "Church Memorial Volume", Logic, Meaning, and Computation: Essays in Memory of Alonzo Church edited by M. Zeleny and C.A. Anderson., Kluwer Publishing Company, Dordrecht, Holland. 1998.
Aristotle's Prior Analytics and Boole's Laws of Thought. . History and Philosophy of Logic 24(2003) 261–288.
Schemata: the Concept of Schema in the History of Logic. Bulletin of Symbolic Logic. 12 (2006) 219–40.
C. I. Lewis: History and Philosophy of Logic. Transactions of the C. S. Peirce Society. 42 (2006)1–9.

Review of "Aristotle, Prior Analytics: Book I, Gisela Striker (translation and commentary), Oxford UP, 2009, 268pp., $39.95 (pbk), ." in the Notre Dame Philosophical Reviews, 2010.02.02.
 "The Absence of Multiple Universes of Discourse in the 1936 Tarski Consequence-Definition Paper", History and Philosophy of Logic 32 (2011): 359–80. Co-author José Miguel Sagüillo. http://www.tandfonline.com/doi/abs/10.1080/01445340.2011.577145#.UksmOD_-kQs
 "Existential Import Today: New Metatheorems; Historical, Philosophical, and Pedagogical Misconceptions", History and Philosophy of Logic 36 (2014): 39–61. Co-author Hassan Masoud. http://www.tandfonline.com/doi/full/10.1080/01445340.2014.952947
For a complete list see John Corcoran's homepage.
Some of his papers are available online: https://buffalo.academia.edu/JohnCorcoran

Service to the profession 
Co-founder with George Weaver of Philadelphia Logic Colloquium 1966
Founder of Buffalo Logic Colloquium  1970.
Chair of Buffalo Logic Colloquium 1970 to present with interruptions.
Founding member of the Editorial Board, History and Philosophy of Logic 1980–present.
Regular reviewer for Mathematical Reviews 1969–present.
Occasional reviewer for Philosophy of Science, Bulletin of Symbolic Logic, and Journal of Symbolic Logic.
Occasional referee for various logic journals.
Organizer of four conferences:
Ancient Logic (Corcoran, Kretzmann, Mueller, et al.) 1972
Nature of Logic (Tarski, Putnam, Friedman, Jech, Vesley, Goodman, et al.) 1973
Church Symposium (Church, Davis, Henkin, Rogers) 1990
Conference on Gaps between Logical Theory and Mathematical Practice (Shapiro, Scanlan, McLarty, Weaver, Tiezsen, Kearns, et al.) 2001.
Sponsor of Alonzo Church for Doctor Honoris Causa at the University at Buffalo 1990.
Board of Editorial Advisors, Cambridge Dictionary of Philosophy 2012–present.

Teaching 
Corcoran's courses are all introductory, having no prerequisites and presupposing no
previous knowledge. In each course he reconstructs its subject-matter from the ground up and never covers the same material twice. Stressing the priority of education over indoctrination and the superiority of learning how to think over learning what to think, he strives to assist his
students in connecting with the reality logic is about so that they may become autonomous judges of the adequacy of the field.

His former students teach at the Autonomous University of Mexico City, Bryn Mawr, Canisius College, Colorado State, Dordt College, Franciscan University, Fredonia State, Ohio State, Oregon State, Pontifical University of Rio de Janeiro, St. John Fisher College, St. John's College, UCLA, University of Lausanne, University of Santiago de Compostela, and elsewhere.

His best-known students include George Boger, James Gasser, Calvin Jongsma, Idris Samawi Hamid, Edward Keenan,Timothy Madigan, Sriram Nambiar, José Miguel Sagüillo, Michael Scanlan, Stewart Shapiro, and George Weaver.

Honors and awards 
Festschrift special double issue of History and Philosophy of Logic 1999 (Eds. M. Scanlan and S. Shapiro);
Exceptional Scholar Award from the University at Buffalo 2002;
Doctor Honoris Causa from University of Santiago de Compostela (Spain) 2003;
Corcoran Symposium, University of Santiago de Compostela (Spain) 2003.
Corcoran Colloquium, University at Buffalo, October 2010.

Bibliography 
 Corcoran, John (2009). "Aristotle's Demonstrative Logic". History and Philosophy of Logic,   30: 1–20.
 Corcoran, John (2009). "Aristotle's Logic at the University of Buffalo's Department of Philosophy".Ideas y Valores: Revista Colombiana de Filosofía, 140 (August 2009) 99–117.  http://www.revistas.unal.edu.co/index.php/idval/article/viewFile/12581/13183

Notes

References 

1937 births
2021 deaths
20th-century American male writers
20th-century American philosophers
20th-century essayists
20th-century linguists
20th-century  American  mathematicians
21st-century American male writers
21st-century American philosophers
21st-century essayists
21st-century linguists
21st-century  American mathematicians
American logicians
American male essayists
American male non-fiction writers
American philosophy academics
Analytic philosophers
Aristotelian philosophers
Epistemologists
Historians of philosophy
Johns Hopkins University alumni
Lecturers
Mathematical logicians
Metaphilosophers
Metaphysicians
Ontologists
People from Baltimore
Philosophers of logic
Philosophers of mathematics
Philosophers of science
University at Buffalo faculty
University of Michigan staff